Ent-kaurene oxidase (Formerly ) is an enzyme with systematic name ent-kaur-16-ene,NADPH:oxygen oxidoreductase (hydroxylating). This enzyme catalyses the following chemical reaction

 ent-kaur-16-ene + 3 NADPH + 3 H+ + 3 O2  ent-kaur-16-en-19-oate + 3 NADP+ + 4 H2O (overall reaction)
(1a) ent-kaur-16-ene + NADPH + H+ + O2  ent-kaur-16-en-19-ol + NADP+ + H2O
(1b) ent-kaur-16-en-19-ol + NADPH + H+ + O2  ent-kaur-16-en-19-al + NADP+ + 2 H2O
(1c) ent-kaur-16-en-19-al + NADPH + O2  ent-kaur-16-en-19-oate + NADP+ + H2O

Ent-kaurene oxidase requires cytochrome P450 and is inhibited by paclobutrazol.

References

External links 
 

EC 1.14.14